was a Japanese football player. He played for Japan's national team. His brother is journalist and former footballer Hiroshi Kagawa.

Club career
Kagawa was born in Kobe on August 9, 1922. After graduating from Kobe University of Economics, he joined Tanabe Pharmaceutical in 1948. He also played for Osaka SC. At Osaka SC, he won the 2nd place at Emperor's Cup 3 times (1951, 1952 and 1953).

National team career
In March 1951, Kagawa was selected to the Japan national team for Japan's first game after World War II, at the 1951 Asian Games. At this competition, on March 7, he debuted against Iran. He also played at the 1954 Asian Games. He played 5 games for Japan until 1954.

Kagawa died on March 6, 1990, at the age of 67. In 2006, he was selected to the Japan Football Hall of Fame.

National team statistics

Honours
Japan
Asian Games Bronze medal: 1951

References

External links
 
 Japan National Football Team Database
Japan Football Hall of Fame at Japan Football Association

1922 births
1990 deaths
Kobe University alumni
Association football people from Hyōgo Prefecture
Japanese footballers
Japan international footballers
Tanabe Mitsubishi Pharma SC players
Asian Games medalists in football
Asian Games bronze medalists for Japan
Footballers at the 1951 Asian Games
Medalists at the 1951 Asian Games
Footballers at the 1954 Asian Games
Association football forwards